The 1975 Medi-Quik Open, also known as the Medi-Quik Women's Tennis Classic, was a women's tennis tournament played on outdoor clay courts at the Westchester Country Club in Harrison, New York in the United States. It was part of the 1975 Virginia Slims WTA Tour and was held from August 18 through August 24, 1975. First-seeded Chris Evert won the singles title and earned $14,000 first-prize money.

Finals

Singles
 Chris Evert defeated  Virginia Wade 6–0, 6–1
 It was Evert's 10th singles title of the year and the 49th of her career.

Doubles
 Chris Evert /  Martina Navratilova defeated  Margaret Court /  Virginia Wade 7–5, 6–7, 6–4

Prize money

References

Medi-Quik Open
Clay court tennis tournaments
Medi-Quik Open
Medi-Quik Open
Medi-Quik Open
Tennis tournaments in New York (state)